The 2018 Travelers Men's NOCA Provincials, the provincial men's curling championship of Northern Ontario was held February 7–11 at the NEMI Rec Centre in Little Current, Ontario. The winning Brad Jacobs team represented Northern Ontario at the 2018 Tim Hortons Brier in Regina, Saskatchewan.

Teams
Teams are as follows:

Round-robin standings

Scores

February 7
Draw 1
Jacobs 6-4 Koivula
Johnston 5-4 Robert
Horgan 7-3 Dumontelle
Chandler 5-4 Montpellier

Draw 2
Montpellier 8-7 Dumontelle
Horgan 6-2 Chandler
Jacobs 8-2 Robert
Johnston 7-4 Koivula

February 8
Draw 3
Horgan 9-3 Robert
Montpellier 7-5 Koivula
Chandler 7-5 Johnston
Jacobs 7-3 Duontelle

Draw 4
Johnston 9-2 Dumontelle
Jacobs 7-6 Chandler
Horgan 8-5 Koivula
Montpellier 12-7 Robert

February 9
Draw 5
Chandler 7-2 Koivula
Robert 5-2 Dumontelle
Johnston 8-3 Montpellier
Horgan 7-3 Jacobs

Draw 6
Johnston 6-5 Jacobs
Horgan 4-2 Montpellier
Robert 6-1 Koivula   
Chandler 8-3 Dumontelle

February 10
Draw 7
Chandler 6-3 Robert  
Dumontelle 8-7 Koivula 
Jacobs 8-5 Montpellier
Horgan 9-4 Johnston

Playoffs

Semifinal 
February 10, 7:30 pm

Final
February 11, 2:00 pm

References

External links
Official site

2018 Tim Hortons Brier
Curling in Northern Ontario
Travelers Men's NOCA Provincials
Northeastern Manitoulin and the Islands
February 2018 sports events in Canada